"Tear It Up (On Our Worst Behavior)" is the debut single by IMx (then credited as Immature). The song appeared on the soundtrack to the film Bébé's Kids and was later added to the group's debut studio album On Our Worst Behavior. It peaked at #29 on the Billboard R&B chart in 1992, being the only charted single of the album.

Chart positions

References

External links
 
 

1992 debut singles
IMx songs
Song recordings produced by Chris Stokes (director)
Songs written by Jermaine Dupri
Songs written by Kuk Harrell
Songs written by Tricky Stewart
Songs written by Chris Stokes (director)
Virgin Records singles
1992 songs